Maghull Football Club are a football club based in Maghull, Merseyside, England.

History
Maghull were founded in 1921, and situated 8 miles north of Liverpool on the main A59 Preston Road, they played their home games at Deyes Lane, just one mile away from their present Old Hall Lane ground. They jointed the Lancashire Combination in 1972 and then the Cheshire County League six years later. During this time they reached the third round of the FA Vase. In 1984 they became one of the founder members of the North West Counties League and were North West Counties Division 2 Champions in 1993 but were not promoted due to ground grading issues. Maghull joined the West Cheshire League Division One for the 1999–2000 season and have played in Division One of that league ever since and have been runners-up twice – 2006–07 and 2010–11.

The club has won a number of local cup competitions during their history, including the Liverpool County Amateur Cup, Liverpool County Challenge Cup, Lancashire Amateur Cup, Lancashire Combination Challenge Cup, Liverpool County Combination League Winners, Liverpool I Zingari League & Cup winners, Bass North West Counties Division Two Winners and the Pyke Cup in 2010–11.

Following a fire in 1991 that destroyed their dressing rooms and Clubhouse, Maghull erected a new building, which now houses dressing rooms and a lounge bar.

Honours
North West Counties League Division Two
Champions 1992–93
West Cheshire League
Champions 2013-14
Runners-up 2006–07, 2010–11

Records
FA Vase
Third Round 1981–82

References

External links

Football clubs in England
Football clubs in Merseyside
Sport in the Metropolitan Borough of Sefton
1921 establishments in England
Lancashire Combination
North West Counties Football League clubs
Maghull
Association football clubs established in 1921
West Cheshire Association Football League clubs
Cheshire County League clubs